Sodium channel subunit beta-1 is a protein that in humans is encoded by the SCN1B gene.

Voltage-gated sodium channels are essential for the generation and propagation of action potentials in striated muscle and neuronal tissues. Biochemically, they consist of a large alpha subunit and 1 or 2 smaller beta subunits, such as SCN1B. The alpha subunit alone can exhibit all the functional attributes of a voltage-gated Na+ channel, but requires a beta-1 subunit for normal inactivation kinetics.[supplied by OMIM]

Clinical significance 

Mutation in the SCN1B gene are  associated with disorders such as Brugada syndrome, Dravet Syndrome, and GEFS.

See also
 Sodium channel

References

Further reading

External links
  GeneReviews/NIH/NCBI/UW entry on Brugada syndrome
 

Sodium channels